Wazir Khan was a title bestowed by Mughal emperors, and may refer to:

Wazir Khan (Lahore) (15th century), governor of Lahore
Wazir Khan Mosque, a mosque in Lahore built by the court physician
Wazir Khan (Sirhind) (1635–1710), governor of Sirhind
Wazir Ali Khan (1780–1817), fourth nawab wazir of Oudh
 Wazir Akbar Khan (1816–1845), Afghan prince
Wazir Akbar Khan, Kabul, a neighbourhood of Kabul named after the Afghan prince
Muhammad Wazir Khan (1834–1864), the second ruler of the princely state of Tonk
Wazir Arsala Khan (19th century), Afghan politician
Wazir Khan (Rampur) (1860–1926), chief musician of Rampur State and a descendant of Naubat Khan

See also
Wazir (disambiguation)
Khan (title)
Khan (surname)

Khan, Wazir